Roll with Me is the fourth studio album by English singer and songwriter Natasha Bedingfield, released on 30 August 2019 through We Are Hear. The lead single "Roller Skate" was released on 19 July 2019; "Kick It" was released on 2 August as the second single and first song serviced to radio from the album, with other songs to become available before the album's release. It was produced by Linda Perry, and follows eight years after the release of her third studio album Strip Me, which was released in 2010.

Background
Bedingfield said her intention with the album was to "make music that moves people and makes them move their bodies and hair. It's bright and bold but in a way that is also raw and honest." Linda Perry stated that she wanted to work with Bedingfield because she feels she is "one of the best live performers I have ever seen and has one of the most versatile voices I have ever heard".

Commercial performance
The album debuted at number 36 on the US Billboard Independent Albums chart.

Track listing
Adapted from the album's liner notes. All songs written by Natasha Bedingfield and Linda Perry.

Personnel
 Natasha Bedingfield – lead vocals (all tracks), background vocals (all tracks)
 Linda Perry – keyboards (2–13), guitar (3, 8, 9, 11), acoustic guitar (4), drum programming (6, 9, 10, 13), background vocals (1), production (1–14), horn arrangement (2, 14), string arrangement (3, 7, 12)
 Luis Flores – assistant engineer (1–14), production (15–18)
 Adam Bravin – drum programming (1–5, 7, 9, 11, 12, 14), keyboards (1), production (1)
 David Saw – guitar (1, 2, 5–8, 10)
 Eli Pearl – guitar (1, 2, 4, 5, 7, 8, 11, 14)
 Angel Haze – lead vocals (3), background vocals (1, 4, 7, 12)
 Troy Nōka – keyboards (5, 6, 8, 11, 14), drum programming (6, 8), production (8)
 David Ralicke – trombone (2, 14)
 David Mayer – saxophone (2, 14)
 Danny Levin – trumpet (2, 14)
 Chris Bautista – trumpet (2, 14)
 Briana Lee – background vocals (2, 8–10, 12, 14)

Charts

References

2019 albums
Natasha Bedingfield albums
Albums produced by Linda Perry
Universal Music Group albums